Hello London is a 1960 documentary film starring Sonja Henie and Michael Wilding. This was also Oliver Reed's film debut.

Cast
 Sonja Henie as herself
 Michael Wilding	as Himself
 Rest of cast listed alphabetically:
 Dora Bryan as Barmaid
 Roy Castle as himself
 Robert Coote as himself
 Lisa Gastoni as herself
 Eunice Gayson as  Herself
 Ronny Graham as himself
 Charles Heslop as himself
 Stanley Holloway as himself
 Oliver Johnston as himself
 Trefor Jones as himself
 Ruth Lee as Woman
 Dennis Priceas Himself
 Oliver Reed as Press photographer

External links

1960 films
Documentary films about London
British documentary films
1960s English-language films
1960s British films